The Lone Wolf Meets a Lady is a 1940 American drama directed by Sidney Salkow, starring Warren William, Eric Blore and Jean Muir.

The Lone Wolf character dates back to 1914, when author Louis Joseph Vance invented him for a series of books, later adapted to twenty-four Lone Wolf films (1917–1949). Warren Williams starred in nine of these films (1939–1943), with The Lone Wolf Meets a Lady being the third starring William as Michael Lanyard.

The film also introduces a sidekick for Lanyard, his bumbling valet Jamison, played by Eric Blore. Blore would play Jamison in seven more films.

Plot

A reformed jewel thief tries to clear a society beauty of murder charges.

Cast

Notes
In February 1940 the MPAA/PCA informed Columbia that a number of changes in the script were necessary before the film could receive certification. Among the many demands by PCA were that the "radio announcer must not be characterized, in any way, as a pansy"; that the drinking in the film be "held to an absolute minimum"; that the hiccuping be eliminated; that the "business of Pete slapping and cuffing Joan" be eliminated; that the film not reveal the details of the crime; and that there be "no showing of panties or other particularly intimate garments."

References

External links 
 
 
 
 

1940 films
Columbia Pictures films
Films directed by Sidney Salkow
American drama films
1940 drama films
American black-and-white films
The Lone Wolf films
1940s English-language films
1940s American films